QWK may refer to:

 every week, medication dosage term
 QWK (file format), used by offline mail readers
 WLEJ (AM) 1450 AM, "QWK" Rock, radio station broadcasting from State College, Pennsylvania, USA
 WQCK 105.9 FM, which also carries the QWK brand in State College, Pennsylvania, USA
 WQWK (defunct) 103.1 FM, a defunct station of State College, Pennsylvania, USA